is a railway station located in Yahatanishi-ku, Kitakyūshū.

Lines 

Chikuhō Electric Railroad
Chikuhō Electric Railroad Line

Platforms

Adjacent stations

Surrounding area
 Mr Max Koyanose 
 SunLive Koyanose
 MaxValu Manago
 Yahatajikei Hospital

Railway stations in Fukuoka Prefecture
Railway stations in Japan opened in 2004